Scotney Castle SSSI is a  biological Site of Special Scientific Interest in the grounds of Scotney Castle, a National Trust property south-east of Tunbridge Wells in  Kent.

This site has parkland, grassland, woodland. There are dormice, a protected species, and several nationally scarce invertebrates, such as Rolph's door snail. There are man-made ponds and a moat.

The gardens are open to the public.

References

Sites of Special Scientific Interest in Kent